In Greek mythology, Phorcys (Phorkus) was a Phrygian ally of King Priam in the Trojan War. Phorcys appears in The Iliad as the leader of the Phrygians, a son of Phaenops. The Bibliotheca, however, refers to him as a son of Aretaon and brother of Ascanius, another Phrygian leader. Phorcys is mentioned among the Trojan allies whom Hector addresses with a speech in Book 17 of the Iliad. He was killed in battle by the Greek hero Ajax.

Phorcys is referenced in Pausanias' Description of Greece: the author explains that Phorcys was referred to as "shieldless" in the Iliad because he was wearing a two-piece corselet, which was thought to provide enough protection in the battle.

Notes

References 

 Apollodorus, The Library with an English Translation by Sir James George Frazer, F.B.A., F.R.S. in 2 Volumes, Cambridge, MA, Harvard University Press; London, William Heinemann Ltd. 1921. ISBN 0-674-99135-4. Online version at the Perseus Digital Library. Greek text available from the same website.
 Homer, The Iliad with an English Translation by A.T. Murray, Ph.D. in two volumes. Cambridge, MA., Harvard University Press; London, William Heinemann, Ltd. 1924. . Online version at the Perseus Digital Library.
 Homer, Homeri Opera in five volumes. Oxford, Oxford University Press. 1920. . Greek text available at the Perseus Digital Library.
 Pausanias, Description of Greece with an English Translation by W.H.S. Jones, Litt.D., and H.A. Ormerod, M.A., in 4 Volumes. Cambridge, MA, Harvard University Press; London, William Heinemann Ltd. 1918. . Online version at the Perseus Digital Library
 Pausanias, Graeciae Descriptio. 3 vols. Leipzig, Teubner. 1903.  Greek text available at the Perseus Digital Library.

People of the Trojan War